Mental health advocacy refers to groups and individuals that advocate for the interests and rights of those who have or have been diagnosed with mental health conditions.

StopSIM